is a song by Japanese singer Chara. It was released as the third single from her album Strange Fruits on February 17, 1999. It debuted at #36 on the Japanese Oricon album charts, and charted for three weeks.

In official descriptions of the song, it is described as having "a cool sound with painful vocals," as well as fusing a club sound with a Beatles-style melody.

Release

The single was released as the lead track from Strange Fruits in February 1999, a month before the album's release.

The song was released on vinyl a month later, on the same day as the album's release. The vinyl's cover was taken from the same photoshoot as the album's was. The vinyl features an exclusive DJ Hasebe remix of the title track, along with an unpublished duet with her then husband, Tadanobu Asano as well as two remixes of an album track, . Tadanobu Asano wrote and composed "Afureteiru" for Chara himself.

The B-side of the single, was a live recording at NHK Hall of a song from her 'Yen Town Band' concept album Montage. Other recordings from this concert date are found on Chara's live album, Live 97-99 Mood.

Other than on Strange Fruits, the song also features on Chara's greatest hits albums Caramel Milk: The Best of Chara and Sugar Hunter: The Best Love Songs of Chara.

Music video

The music video was shot by directorial pair Blaine & Justin. It features Chara in night scenes throughout Tokyo. She begins in a lit park, holding a large purple sketch book. As she puts the book down, a superimposed image of her begins to travel beyond her. The superimposed version of herself visits various scenes throughout Tokyo, including an escalator, night trains and the park from the beginning. During this time, she sketches houses, hearts and writes cursive script in the sketch book. The video ends with non-superimposed Chara waking up in the park at dawn.

As of April 20, 2010 the music video for "70% (Yūgure no Uta)" has been viewed 147,000 times on popular video-sharing website YouTube.

Track listing

Single

Vinyl

Chart Rankings

Oricon Charts (Japan)

References

Chara (singer) songs
1999 singles
Japanese-language songs
Songs written by Chara (singer)
1999 songs
Song recordings produced by Zentaro Watanabe